is a Japanese conductor and composer. In Japan he is known among his fans as “Kobaken.”

Biography
Born in Iwaki, Fukushima, Kobayashi's father was a high school music teacher, and mother was a primary school teacher. Kobayashi started composing music at the age of 11, studied composition and conducting under Mareo Ishiketa (composition), Kazuo Yamada (conducting), and Akeo Watanabe (conducting) at Tokyo University of the Arts.

Kobayashi won the 1st prize and the special award at the International Conductors Competition on Hungarian television in 1974. He has led orchestras in Germany, Austria, Britain, and Netherlands. Kobayashi has been resident conductor of the Tokyo Metropolitan Symphony Orchestra and Kyoto Symphony Orchestra. Kobayashi was appointed to the principal conductor of Japan Philharmonic Orchestra (1988–90), chief conductor (1990–94, 1997–2004), music director (2004–07) and conductor laureate since 2010.

Kobayashi served the principal guest conductor of the Kansai and Kyushu Orchestras. He was general music director of Nagoya Philharmonic Orchestra from 1998 to 2001, music director from 2001 to 2003, is now appointed to the conductor laureate since 2003. Kobayashi was appointed to the special guest conductor of Yomiuri Nippon Symphony Orchestra in August 2011, appointed to the music director of Tokyo Bunka Kaikan in June 2012.

In Europe, Kobayashi served the principal conductor of Hungarian State Symphony (now Hungarian National Philharmonic) from 1987–97, and is now conductor laureate of the orchestra.  Kobayashi was the first Asian conductor who had conducted Czech Philharmonic at the Prague Spring International Music Festival in 2002. He has held the regular guest conductorship with Czech Philharmonic. He was one of three conductors who primarily led the orchestra after the resignation of Gerd Albrecht from the chief conductorship orchestra in 1996 and before advent of Vladimir Ashkenazy in 1998.

In 2006, he became vaste dirigent ('permanent conductor') of Het Gelders Orkest of Arnhem, Netherlands. He is a former music professor of Tokyo University of the Arts(now holds the emeritus professorship), the emeritus professor of Tokyo College of Music and Franz Liszt Academy of Music.

His compositions include his Passacaglia for orchestra, in honour of the 400th anniversary of relations between Japan and the Netherlands in the year 2000. Kobayashi directed the premiere with the Netherlands Philharmonic Orchestra in 1999.

Kobayashi's daughter Ayano, is a pianist, and her sister, Yuko Ichinose, is an opera soprano singer.

Kobayashi received the Liszt Memorial Decoration (1986), the Hungarian Order of Culture (1990), and the Middle Cross with the Star of the Order of the Republic of Hungary decoration (the highest civilian honour) from the Hungarian government in 1994. In 2000 he was awarded the Hanno R. Ellenbogen Citizenship Award jointly given by the Prague Society for International Cooperation and Global Panel Foundation.

External links

 Dutch-language biography of Kobayashi
 Budapest Spring Festival 2007, "Kodály evening with the National Philharmonic Orchestra and Choir"

References

1940 births
20th-century classical composers
20th-century conductors (music)
20th-century Hungarian musicians
20th-century Japanese composers
20th-century Japanese male musicians
20th-century Japanese people
21st-century classical composers
21st-century conductors (music)
21st-century Hungarian musicians
21st-century Japanese composers
21st-century Japanese people
21st-century Japanese male musicians
Hungarian classical composers
Hungarian conductors (music)
Hungarian male classical composers
Japanese classical composers
Japanese conductors (music)
Japanese expatriates in Hungary
Japanese male classical composers
Japanese male conductors (music)
Living people
Musicians from Budapest
Musicians from Fukushima Prefecture
Tokyo University of the Arts alumni